The statue of Charlemagne is a prominent public sculpture representing Charlemagne in Aachen. It was first erected in 1620 on the Marktplatz in front of Aachen Town Hall, as part of the monumental  fountain. The statue now standing on the Karlsbrunnen is a 1969 copy, and the original has been kept since 2014 at the nearby  museum. It has become the most popular image of Charlemagne in the monarch's chosen capital of Aachen.

History

A medieval fountain was erected on the Marktplatz around 1334.

The fountain was modified by Johann Joseph Couven in the 1730s. The statue was appropriated by French troops during the Rhineland Campaign of 1792 and transferred to Paris, but Napoleon gave it back to Aachen in June 1805 upon a request from Aachen Mayor , who had visited Paris in December 1804 and attended Napoleon's coronation ceremony. It was removed again during World War II for protection and kept in the town hall's basement until re-erection in 1948.

in 1969, the statue was deposed on preservation grounds and replaced by the current copy.

Gallery

See also
 Equestrian statue of Charlemagne (Cornacchini)
 Alte Brücke (Frankfurt)
 Statue of Charlemagne (Liège)
 Charlemagne et ses Leudes
 Iconography of Charlemagne

Notes

Cultural depictions of Charlemagne
Fountains in Germany
Outdoor sculptures in Germany
Monuments and memorials in North Rhine-Westphalia